Hitchcock/Truffaut is a 2015 French-American documentary film directed by Kent Jones. It is about François Truffaut's 1966 book on Alfred Hitchcock, Hitchcock/Truffaut, and its impact on cinema. Truffaut had interviewed his fellow film director Hitchcock over the course of eight days in 1962 at the latter's offices at Universal Studios , Hollywood, to write his book. The documentary features reflections from directors including James Gray, Martin Scorsese, Paul Schrader, Wes Anderson, David Fincher, Arnaud Desplechin, and Olivier Assayas, and is narrated by Bob Balaban, who co-starred with Truffaut in Close Encounters of the Third Kind (1977).

Hitchcock/Truffaut premiered at the 2015 Cannes Film Festival and was shown in the TIFF Docs section of the 2015 Toronto International Film Festival. The film $300,000 at the box office.

Cast
 Alfred Hitchcock
 François Truffaut
 Wes Anderson
 Olivier Assayas
 Peter Bogdanovich
 Arnaud Desplechin
 David Fincher
 James Gray
 Kiyoshi Kurosawa
 Richard Linklater
 Paul Schrader
 Martin Scorsese

Reception
Hitchcock/Truffaut received critical acclaim. On Rotten Tomatoes, the film has a 95% "Certified Fresh" score based on 110 reviews, with an average rating of 7.7/10. The site's consensus states: "Essential viewing for cineastes while still offering rich rewards for neophytes, Hitchcock/Truffaut offers an affectionate -- and well-crafted -- tribute to a legend". Metacritic reports a 79 out of 100 rating based on 25 critics, indicating "generally favorable reviews".

Chris Nashawaty of Entertainment Weekly gave the film a grade of "A−", commenting that "the best part is getting to hear both men talk about their art in exhaustive, almost fetishistic detail." Peter Travers of Rolling Stone gave the film 3.5 stars out of 4, saying, "My only problem with Hitchcock/Truffaut is that it's too short at 80 minutes." Peter Debruge of Variety called it "Accessible yet intelligent". Todd McCarthy of The Hollywood Reporter stated that "this documentary will be a top draw wherever films about filmmakers are welcome."

At the 38th Denver Film Festival, it won the Maysles Brothers Award for Best Documentary Film.

References

External links
 
 
 
 

2015 films
2015 documentary films
2010s French-language films
2010s Japanese-language films
French documentary films
American documentary films
Documentary films about the film industry
Films based on non-fiction books
Works about Alfred Hitchcock
Films directed by Kent Jones
2010s English-language films
2010s American films
2010s French films
2015 multilingual films
French multilingual films
American multilingual films